Janaka Wakkumbura (born 15 December 1967) is a Sri Lankan politician. He is a member of the Parliament of Sri Lanka and Kalawana SLPP organiser. Following the mass resignation of the Sri Lankan cabinet in the wake of the 2022 Sri Lankan protests, he was appointed as the Minister of Agriculture and Irrigation by President Gotabaya Rajapaksa on 18 April 2022. He served until 9 May 2022 following another mass resignation of the Sri Lankan cabinet.

Notes

References

External links 
 http://www.parliament.lk/members-of-parliament/directory-of-members/viewMember/3168

Members of the 14th Parliament of Sri Lanka
Members of the 15th Parliament of Sri Lanka
Members of the 16th Parliament of Sri Lanka
Sri Lanka Podujana Peramuna politicians
Living people
Sri Lanka Freedom Party politicians
United People's Freedom Alliance politicians
1967 births